Bryan Lavastida (born November 27, 1998) is an American professional baseball catcher for the Cleveland Guardians of Major League Baseball (MLB).

Career
Lavastida attended Westland Hialeah Senior High School and played college baseball at Hillsborough Community College. He was drafted by the Cleveland Indians in the 15th round of the 2018 Major League Baseball draft.

Lavastida made his professional debut with the Arizona League Indians, batting .292 over 33 games. He played 2019 with the Mahoning Valley Scrappers and Lake County Captains, slashing .335/.410/.481 with two home runs and 38 runs batted in over 59 games. He did not play in 2020 because the season was cancelled due to the COVID-19 pandemic. He started 2021 with Lake County before being promoted to the Akron RubberDucks. He was promoted to the Columbus Clippers in September. Over 84 games between the two teams, he slashed .289/.380/.456 with nine home runs, 51 runs batted in, and 16 stolen bases.

The newly named Cleveland Guardians selected Lavastida to their 40-man roster on November 19, 2021. On April 2, 2022, the Guardians announced that he had been named to the Opening Day roster.

References

External links 

1998 births
Living people
People from Hialeah, Florida
Baseball players from Florida
Major League Baseball catchers
Cleveland Guardians players
Hillsborough Hawks baseball players
Wisconsin Woodchucks players
Arizona League Indians players
Mahoning Valley Scrappers players
Lake County Captains players
Akron RubberDucks players
Columbus Clippers players